Quassiremus is a genus of eels in the snake eel family Ophichthidae. It currently contains the following species:

 Quassiremus ascensionis (Studer, 1889) (Black-spotted snake eel)
 Quassiremus evionthas (D. S. Jordan & Bollman, 1890) (Galapagos snake eel)
 Quassiremus nothochir (C. H. Gilbert, 1890) (Smallfish snake eel)
 Quassiremus polyclitellum Castle, 1996

References

 

Ophichthidae
Ray-finned fish genera
Taxa named by David Starr Jordan